Šentvid pri Zavodnju ( or ) is a dispersed settlement in the Municipality of Šoštanj in northern Slovenia. It lies in the Mozirje Hills northwest of the town of Šoštanj. The area is part of the traditional region of Styria. The entire municipality is now included in the Savinja Statistical Region.

Name
The name of the settlement was changed from Sveti Vid pri Zavodnju (literally, 'Saint Vitus near Zavodnje') to Šentvid pri Zavodnju in 1955. The name was changed on the basis of the 1948 Law on Names of Settlements and Designations of Squares, Streets, and Buildings as part of efforts by Slovenia's postwar communist government to remove religious elements from toponyms.

History
On 22 February 1944 the Slovene poet and Yugoslav people's hero Karel Destovnik (a.k.a. Kajuh) was killed in fighting with German troops in the hamlet of Žlebnik south of the main settlement. A simple granite block marks the site.

References

External links
Šentvid pri Zavodnju at Geopedia

Populated places in the Municipality of Šoštanj